Five Enough is a 2016 South Korea television series starring Ahn Jae-wook, So Yoo-jin, Shim Hyung-tak, Shim Yi-young, Im Soo-hyang, Shin Hye-sun, Sung Hoon and Ahn Woo-yeon. It aired on KBS2 from February 20 to August 21, 2016 for 54 episodes.

Synopsis
This is the story of five pairs of lovers and their families.

The principal pair are Lee Sang-tae (Ahn Jae-wook) and Ahn Mi-jung (So Yoo-jin).  Sang-tae is a widower who has raised two children with the help of his overbearing in-laws, the parents of his deceased wife, played by Choi Jung-woo as Jang Min-ho and Song Ok-sook as Park Ok-soon; while Mi-jung is divorced with three young children. Her husband, Yoon In-chul (Kwon Oh-joong) had cheated on her with her former best friend Kang So-young (Wang Bit-na).  She does not tell her children or her feisty grandmother, who lives with them and looks after the children, that her ex-husband and best friend have got married.  Instead she pretends he has been working in America. However, when he and So-young, along with So-young's mother, open a bakery not too far from Mi-jung's apartment, it becomes inevitable that the secret will come out.

Sang-tae, who is gentlemanly and reserved, is a team leader of the marketing group in charge of the Fantom sportswear brand; early in the series, Mi-jung, who has a somewhat fiery temper, meets him when she becomes an assistant manager in the same group. Both are highly capable at their jobs. Sang-tae somewhat involuntarily becomes involved in Ahn Mi-jung's family problems.  Gradually, the two fall in love with each other, but their relationship is not well received by their families.  In particular, Sang-tae's in-laws have come to treat the widower of their deceased daughter as if he were their own son and they resist the idea of his dating or marrying, lest he move out and take his children with him to a new home.  Meanwhile, Sang-tae's parents would like him to remarry, although before meeting Mi-jung he had shown no inclination to do so as he and especially his children are living comfortably with his in-laws.  But when his mother finds out that Mi-jung is divorced with three young children, she also opposes the couple's developing relationship.

At the same time, Sang-tae's shy younger sister, Lee Yeon-Tae (Shin Hye-sun), has had a secret crush on her university classmate, Kim Tae-min (Ahn Woo-yeon), for seven years but has never had the nerve to confess to him. Tae-min had a crush on her for a time but could never penetrate Yeon-tae's wall of shyness. Just as Yeon-tae finally musters up the courage to confess, Tae-min meets Sang-tae's sister-in-law, Jang Jin-joo (Im Soo-hyang). Jin-joo is beautiful, outgoing, although an academic lightweight whose wealthy parents largely ignore her in favor of Sang-tae and his children and try to buy her affection with a car and credit cards, which they try to use as means to control her. She easily befriends Tae-min and the two fall for each other, leaving Yeon-tae heartbroken. Yeon-tae later gets drunk at a club and by coincidence ends up in a car with Kim Sang-min (Sung Hoon), Tae-min's brother, whose cellphone she accidentally walks off with. This results in a series of prickly meetings between the two, during the course of which Sang-min, who is a successful pro golfer and former fashion model, falls hard for Yeon-tae. He vigorously pursues her but she at first and for a long time rebuffs him.  Complicating matters for Sang-min is that he has an endorsement deal with Sang-tae and Mi-jung's company, Fantom, and he is a famously difficult celebrity, but he is forced to moderate his behavior as he comes to realize that Yeon-tae is Sang-tae's sister. Another key plot point is that neither Yeon-tae realizes that Sang-min and Tae-min are brothers nor does Sang-min realize that Yeon-tae and Tae-min, having just graduated from teacher training school, are friends and working at the same school (which four of the five children attend - Mi-jung's youngest is too young to be in school).

The final pair is Sang-tae's younger brother, Lee Ho-tae (Shim Hyung-tak), a film director who runs out of money to make his movie and has become homeless and unemployed and so forced to return home, where he is not welcome, and Mo Soon-young (Shim Yi-young), a former dancer who now waits tables at the Lee family restaurant, although she doesn't realize that he is her employer's son and he somehow doesn't realize that she works for his parents.

The series takes us through the love lives of the five couples, the difficulties they face from their various parents, and, in the case of Sang-tae and Mi-jung, their challenges in bringing their five children together, which prove problematic even though four of the children were already friends at school.

Cast

Main characters
Ahn Jae-wook as Lee Sang-tae: A single father of two children after the death of his wife. Team Leader of the marketing team at "Fantom" fashion corporation.
So Yoo-jin as Ahn Mi-jung: A single mom of three children, a hard-working, well-spoken employee on the "Fantom" marketing team.
Shim Hyung-tak as Lee Ho-tae: A jobless man, once a film director. Lee Sang-tae's younger brother. 
Shim Yi-young as Mo Soon-young: A former waitress. Lee Ho-tae's first love turned wife.
Ahn Woo-yeon as Kim Tae-min: An elementary school teacher. Sang-min's younger brother and Yeon-tae's friend, Jin-joo's love interest. Teaches at the same school as Yeon-tae. (He and Yeon-tae secretly had a crush on each other for seven years.) Yoon Woo-young and Lee Soo are in his class.
Im Soo-hyang as Jang Jin-joo: A college drop-out who loves to shop. Sang-tae's sister-in-law and Yeon-tae's friend, Tae-min's love interest.
Sung Hoon as Kim Sang-min: A model turned professional golfer, Yeon-tae's love interest
Shin Hye-sun as Lee Yeon-tae: A shy elementary school teacher. Sang-tae's younger sister, Jang Jin-joo's friend and Tae-min's friend, Sang-min's love interest. Yoon Woo-ri and Lee Bin are in her class.

Supporting characters

Sang-tae's family
Jang Yong as Lee Shin-wook: Sang-tae's father. Sit-down restaurant proprietor.
Park Hye-sook as Oh Mi-sook: Sang-tae's mother, restaurant proprietor's wife.
Jo Hyun-do as Lee Soo, son, age 11, plays cello, raised by wealthy maternal grandparents
Kwon Soo-jung as Lee Bin, daughter, age 9, plays piano, dreams of being an actress, raised (possibly spoiled) by wealthy maternal grandparents

Mi-jung's family
Sung Byung-sook as Jang Soon-ae: Mi-jung's grandmother, age 75
Jung Yoon-seok as Yoon Woo-young, son, age 11, learned responsibility at an early age
Kwak Ji-hye as Yoon Woo-ri, daughter, age 9, dreams of being an actress
Choi Yoo-ri as Yoon Woo-joo, daughter, age 5, inseparable from her pet rock "Woo-jin" which she says is her baby brother

Jin-joo's family
Choi Jung-woo as Jang Min-ho: Jin-joo's father, wealthy former loan shark with elementary-school education 
Song Ok-sook as Park Ok-soon: Jin-joo's mother, also never made it to high school. This couple is lavishing their grandchildren (Soo and Bin) with everything money can buy to cover the pain of the loss of their older daughter. They mostly ignore Jin-joo.
"Brain" - The housekeeper with a university education, constantly giving advice. Jung-woo and Ok-sook, having never learned any English, call their maid "Brain" because they think it means "housekeeper."
"Driver Park" the chauffeur

Sang-min and Tae-min's Family
The parents are wealthy retired professors who spend most of their time living on an island. They value intellect and education and thus dote on their second son (Tae-min), a teacher of modest means, and ignore their older son (Sang-min), the renowned pro golfer.
Park Hae-mi as Cha Min-kyung, Tae-min & Sang-min's mother 
Go In-Beom as Kim Seung-wook, Tae-min & Sang-min's father

Kang So-young's family
Wang Bit-na as Kang So-young: Ahn Mi-jung's friend and Yoon In-chul's new wife.
Kim Chung as Lee Jum-sook, So-young's mother, proprietor of a bakery/cafe; she pays the child support for In-chul and Mi-jung's three children.
Kwon Oh-joong as Yoon In-chul: Ahn Mi-jung deadbeat ex-husband; he married the woman he had an affair with.

Marketing team
Jun Se-hyun as Chun Sung-hee - she has a crush on Team Leader Sang-tae.
Lee Chan-hee as Park Hae-sung
Hae Bit-na as Yoo Young-jae

Other
Kim Hyun as Helper
Lee Ji-ha as Counselor
Kim Ji-eun as Sang-tae's blind date partner (episode 5)
----- as Manager Do (Kim Sang-min's manager)
----- as Yeong-mi (episode 6)

Ratings 
In the tables below, the blue numbers represent the lowest ratings and the red numbers represent the highest ratings.

Awards and nominations

References

External links
  
 
 

Korean Broadcasting System television dramas
2016 South Korean television series debuts
2016 South Korean television series endings
Korean-language television shows
South Korean romance television series
South Korean comedy-drama television series
Television series by AStory